Drexciya was an American electronic music duo from Detroit, Michigan, consisting of James Stinson (1969–2002) and Gerald Donald.

Career
The majority of Drexciya's releases were in the style of dance-floor oriented electro, punctuated with elements of retro and 1980s Detroit techno, with occasional excursions into the ambient and industrial genres. They had 3 releases on the highly influential Underground Resistance Detroit record label. Tracks were mostly centered around the Roland TR-808 drum machine.

Drexciya, which eschewed media attention and its attendant focus on personality, developed a nautical afrofuturist myth. The group revealed in the sleeve notes to their 1997 album The Quest that "Drexciya" was an underwater country populated by the unborn children of pregnant African women who were thrown off of slave ships; the babies had adapted to breathe underwater in their mothers' wombs. The myth was built partly on Paul Gilroy's The Black Atlantic: Modernity and Double Consciousness (1993), according to Kodwo Eshun.

In 1997, Drexciya released a compilation album, titled The Quest. The duo released three studio albums: Neptune's Lair (1999), Harnessed the Storm (2002), and Grava 4 (2002).

Stinson died suddenly on 3 September 2002 of a heart condition. Gerald Donald continues to produce music under other names such as Dopplereffekt with To Nhan Le Thi and Japanese Telecom.

Discography

Studio albums
 Neptune's Lair (1999), Tresor
 Harnessed the Storm (2002), Tresor
 Grava 4 (2002), Clone

Compilation albums
 The Quest (1997), Submerge
 Journey of the Deep Sea Dweller I (2011), Clone
 Journey of the Deep Sea Dweller II (2012), Clone
 Journey of the Deep Sea Dweller III (2013), Clone
 Journey of the Deep Sea Dweller IV (2013), Clone

EPs
 Deep Sea Dweller (1992), Shockwave Records
 Drexciya 2: Bubble Metropolis (1993), Underground Resistance
 Drexciya 3: Molecular Enhancement (1994), Rephlex, Submerge
 Drexciya 4: The Unknown Aquazone (1994), Submerge
 Aquatic Invasion (1994), Underground Resistance
 The Journey Home (1995), Warp Records
 The Return of Drexciya (1996), Underground Resistance
 Uncharted (1997), Somewhere in Detroit
 Hydro Doorways (2000), Tresor

Singles
 "Fusion Flats" (2000), Tresor
 "Digital Tsunami" (2001), Tresor
 "Drexciyan R.E.S.T. Principle" (2002), Clone

References

Further reading
 More Brilliant Than The Sun: Adventures In Sonic Fiction by Kodwo Eshun, pp. 06[083] - 06[085] (Quartet Books, London, 1998)

External links
 
 
 Artist page with extensive discography at Global Darkness
 The Drexciya Research Lab blog

American techno music groups
American dance musicians
American electro musicians
Musical groups from Detroit
American musical duos
Electronic music duos 
Musical groups established in 1992
Afrofuturism
1992 establishments in Michigan